Jess Gerald Atkinson (born December 11, 1961) is a former American football placekicker in the National Football League for the St. Louis Cardinals, New York Giants, Washington Redskins, and the Indianapolis Colts.  He played college football at the University of Maryland.

Since his departure from WUSA, he has gone into different ventures, many of which keep him closely associated with his alma mater.  His most recent venture is the production of the television series Terrapins Rising, which is a reality show about the Maryland Terrapins football team that airs on Comcast Sportsnet.

References

Jess Atkinson Stats/Pro-Football-Reference.com

1961 births
Living people
Players of American football from Ann Arbor, Michigan
American football placekickers
Maryland Terrapins football players
St. Louis Cardinals (football) players
New York Giants players
Washington Redskins players
Indianapolis Colts players
American broadcasters